The Kalergi Plan, sometimes called the Coudenhove-Kalergi Conspiracy, is a far-right, antisemitic, white genocide conspiracy theory. The theory alleges that which claims that Austrian-Japanese politician Richard von Coudenhove-Kalergi concocted a plot to mix white Europeans with other races via immigration. The conspiracy theory is most often associated with European groups and parties, but it has also spread to North American politics.

Origins 
The conspiracy theory stems from a section of Kalergi's 1925 book Praktischer Idealismus ("Practical Idealism"), in which he predicted that a mixed race of the future would arise: "The man of the future will be of mixed race. Today's races and classes will gradually disappear owing to the vanishing of space, time, and prejudice. The Eurasian-Negroid race of the future, similar in its appearance to the Ancient Egyptians, will replace the diversity of peoples with a diversity of individuals." Modern far-right individuals seek to draw relationships between contemporary European policy-making and this quote.

Austrian neo-Nazi writer Gerd Honsik wrote about the subject in his book Kalergi Plan (2005). The independent Italian newspaper Linkiesta investigated the conspiracy theory and described it as a hoax which is comparable to the fabricated anti-semitic document The Protocols of the Elders of Zion.

Reception 
The Southern Poverty Law Center describes the Kalergi plan as a distinctly European way of pushing the white genocide conspiracy theory on the continent, with white nationalists quoting Coudenhove-Kalergi's writings out of context in order to assert that the European Union's immigration policies were insidious plots that were hatched decades ago in order to destroy white people. Hope Not Hate, an anti-racism advocacy group, has described it as a racist conspiracy theory which alleges that Coudenhove-Kalergi intended to influence Europe's policies on immigration in order to create a "populace devoid of identity" which would then supposedly be ruled by a Jewish elite.

In his 2018 novel Middle England, author Jonathan Coe satirizes the concept with his conspiracy theorist character Peter Stopes.

In 2019, the right-wing nonprofit organization Turning Point USA posted a photograph on Twitter in which a person was holding a beach ball that featured text promoting this conspiracy theory. The tweet was deleted soon after.

See also 
 Great Replacement
 The Camp of the Saints
 Miscegenation pamphlet

Footnotes

References

Further reading 
 
 
 

Alt-right
Anti-immigration politics in Europe
Conspiracy theories in Europe
Conspiracy theories involving race and ethnicity
Cultural assimilation
Euroscepticism
Demographics of Europe
Nazism
Multiracial affairs
Neo-Nazi concepts
Political catchphrases
White genocide conspiracy theory
Anti-immigration politics in North America
Richard von Coudenhove-Kalergi